is a Japanese tarento, master of ceremonies, yoga instructor, lyricist and former gravure idol. She is from Saitama. She was a member of Japanese pop music formations Nakano Fujoshi Sisters and Nakano Fujo Sisters#Fudanjuku.

Filmography

Videos & DVDs 
 Pure Smile Chiaki Kyan, Takeshobo 2003
 Can can!, 2004
 Gachinko Suie Battle Taikai (ガチンコ水泳・バトル大会), 2004
 Love Lovery, 2005
 Hajimete no Hanko (はじめての反抗), 2005
 Matatabi Pu (またたびぷぅ), 2006
 Pleasure Kiss, 2006
 Chiaki Kyan i Can!!!, 2006

Bibliography

Photobooks 
 CANDY, Saibunkan 2003

Magazines 
 Kyan-tastic World (きゃんたすてぃっくわーるど), Gamelabo
 Tech Honey is in Special Training now (テックハニーのただいま特訓中), Tech Research Institute

References

External links 
GIRL'S RECORD Chiaki Kyan 
Kyan-chi Mainchi!  - Official Blog with her photographs, since July 2006
Chiaki Kyan☆Sugar, Spice and Everything Nice  - Former Official Blog with her photographs, from October 2004 to June 2006
Chiaki Kyan Official Blog "Kyan-chirarism"  - Another Official Blog with her photographs, since December 2006
Nakano Fujoshi Sisters' "Fu-jockey"  - Appears on every Fridays
Egg Idol Hyper Chiaki Kyan 
Gravure Idol Video clips! Chiaki Kyan 

1984 births
Living people
Models from Saitama Prefecture
Japanese gravure models
Musicians from Saitama Prefecture